Dunnicaer, or Dun-na-caer, is a precipitous sea stack just off the coast of Aberdeenshire, Scotland, between Dunnottar Castle and Stonehaven. Despite the unusual difficulty of access, in 1832 Pictish symbol stones were found on the summit and 21st-century archaeology has discovered evidence of a Pictish hill fort which may have incorporated the stones in its structure. The stones may have been incised in the third or fourth centuries AD but this goes against the general archaeological view that the simplest and earliest (Class I) symbol stones date from the fifth or even seventh century AD.

Sea stack

Sited between Stonehaven and the similarly situated Dunnottar Castle, the sea stack is in Strathlethan Bay, with Downie Point to the north and just offshore from the cliffs at Bowdun Head to the south. The conglomerate rock is lower Old Red Sandstone.

Hill fort

During archaeological investigations on the summit in 1977 and 1982 nothing of significance was found. In 2015 new excavations by an Aberdeen University team started to reveal the presence of a hill fort and excavations were continued in the following years. There had been a stone rampart framed with timbers leading southwest to the mainland. From radiocarbon dating of the timber the fort has been dated to being used between the second and fourth centuries AD making it the earliest known Pictish fort in Scotland. A hearth and the footings of internal rooms have been found. Glass, samian ware and black-burnished ware pottery and a lead weight have been excavated: all unusual for so far north of the frontier of the Roman empire. Over the centuries some parts of the fort have collapsed away with the erosion of the surrounding cliffs, particularly to the east.

The discoveries suggest that the fort was a substantial, high-status building, with stone and oak timbers brought in from a distance. It was later abandoned, possibly when the inhabitants moved to Dunnottar, and possibly because of problems with the erosion of the stack.

Symbol stones

As early as 1819 a symbol stone had been prised from the stack to be used as a hearthstone but the inscriptions had excited little interest. In 1832 some youths had climbed up and found a wall on the summit plateau of the stack. They threw some of the stones down into the sea and when they were later recovered some of them proved to be Pictish symbol stones.

In 1857 these symbol stones were documented by Alexander Thomson. They were illustrated in John Stuart's 1856 and 1867 volumes of The Sculptured Stones of Scotland published by the Spalding Club. A thorough description of the symbols was published in 1992. One stone is now in the Marischal Museum and the others are at Banchory House. The design and relatively small size of the stones is unusual and it shows them to be of an early date – they were probably set into the wall of the rampart that has been dated as third to fourth century AD. – this is a much earlier date than the conventional view that the simplest and earliest (Class I) stones are from the fifth or even seventh century AD.

Notes

References

Citations

Works cited

Further reading
 – the illustrator also drew some of the images in Stuart's first volume of Sculptured Stones Of Scotland

External links
 

Kincardine and Mearns
Stacks of Scotland
Hill forts in Scotland
Archaeological sites in Aberdeenshire
Pictish stones in Aberdeenshire
Landforms of Aberdeenshire